Starcastle is the first studio album by American progressive rock band Starcastle.

Reception

Paul Collins of AllMusic gave the album three stars out of five. He commented that the album was a "decent enough debut" but also said that later records would show that the band was capable of better. Collins also called the album's leadoff track, "Lady Of The Lake", "a wonderfully sprawling song" and an "epic".

Track listing
All songs written by Starcastle

Side 1
 "Lady of the Lake" - 10:26
 "Elliptical Seasons" - 4:27
 "Forces" - 6:25

Side 2
 "Stargate" - 2:54
 "Sunfield" - 7:36
 "To the Fire Wind" - 5:16
 "Nova" - 2:35

Credits

Band
Terry Luttrell - lead vocals
Matthew Stewart - backing vocals, electric guitar
Stephen Hagler - backing vocals, electric guitar
Gary Strater - backing vocals, bass guitar, Moog Taurus
Herb Schildt - piano, synthesizer, organ
Stephen Tassler - backing vocals, drums, percussion

Production
Norm Kinney - producer, engineer
Tommy Vicari - producer, engineer
Ed Lee - art direction
David Gulick - photography
Alex Ebel - artwork
Gerard Huerta - hand lettering

References

Starcastle albums
1976 debut albums
Epic Records albums